Heartbound is the debut album by Australian post-hardcore band Dream On, Dreamer. It was released in Australia (We Are Unified) on 5 August, in Japan (Triple Vision) on 3 August and in the US/Europe/UK (Rise) on 9 August 2011.

Background
The album has spawned one single so far entitled, "Downfall". A music video has also been made to coincide with the song. A second song, "Come Home True Love", was posted on themusic.com.au the last week of July.

Track listing

Personnel

Dream On, Dreamer
 Marcel Gadacz - lead vocals
 Callan Orr - lead guitar
 Luke Domic - rhythm guitar
 Michael McLeod - bass guitar, clean vocals
 Daniel Jungwirth - keyboards, synthesizers, piano, programming
 Aaron Fiocca - drums

Production
Produced, engineered, mixed and mastered by Cameron Mizell
Co written by Kevin Orr
Artwork & Design by Ken Taylor
A&R by Luke Logemann

References

2011 albums
Dream On, Dreamer albums
Rise Records albums